Julia Drusilla (16 September AD 16 – 10 June AD 38) was a member of the Roman imperial family, the second daughter and fifth child of Germanicus and Agrippina the Elder to survive infancy. She was the favorite sister of Emperor Caligula, who, after her death, had her deified under the name Diva Drusilla Panthea, and named his daughter Julia Drusilla after her.

Biography

Early life 
Drusilla was born in Abitarvium, modern day Koblenz, Germany. Besides the future emperor she also had two other brothers, Nero Julius Caesar and Drusus Caesar, as well as two sisters, Julia Livilla and the later empress Agrippina the Younger. She was a great-granddaughter of the Emperor Augustus and empress Livia, grand-niece of the Emperor Tiberius, niece of the Emperor Claudius, and aunt of the Emperor Nero. After the death of her father, Germanicus, she and her siblings were brought back to Rome by their mother and raised with the help of their paternal grandmother, Antonia Minor.

Marriages 
In 33, Drusilla was married to Lucius Cassius Longinus, a friend of the Emperor Tiberius. She and Cassius are not known to have had any children. After Caligula became emperor in 37 he ordered their divorce and married his sister to his friend, Marcus Aemilius Lepidus. 

During an illness in 37, Caligula changed his will to name Drusilla his heir, making her the first woman to be named heir in a Roman imperial will. This was probably an attempt to continue the Julian line through any children she might have, leaving her husband to rule in the meantime. Caligula recovered however, and in 38, at the age of twenty-one, Drusilla died. Her brother went on to deify her, consecrating her with the title Panthea (all-goddess) and mourning at her public funeral as though he were a widower.

Reputation

Reportedly, Drusilla was her brother's favorite. There also are rumors that they were lovers, with the two reportedly having been together while they were still underage. If true, that role probably gained her great influence over Caligula. Although the activities between the brother and sister might have been seen as incestuous by their contemporaries, it is not certain whether they were sexual partners. Even if their relationship was not sexual, their close relationship was still very public. Caligula would treat her as if she was his "legal wife" even while she was married. Drusilla earned a rather poor reputation because of the close bond she shared with Caligula and even was likened to a prostitute by later scholars, in attempts to discredit Caligula.

Some historians suggest that Caligula was motivated by more than mere lust or love in pursuing intimate relationships with his sisters, thinking instead, that he may have decided deliberately to pattern the Roman lineage after the Hellenistic monarchs of the Ptolemaic dynasty where marriages between jointly ruling brothers and sisters had become tradition rather than sex scandals. This also has been used to explain why his despotism apparently was more evident to his contemporaries than those of Augustus and Tiberius.

The source of many of the rumors surrounding Caligula and Drusilla may be derived from formal Roman dining habits. It was customary in patrician households for the host and hostess of a dinner (or in other words, the husband and the wife in charge of the household) to hold the positions of honor at banquets in their residence. In the case of a young bachelor being the head of the household, the female position of honor traditionally was to be held by his sisters, in rotation. In Caligula's case, Agrippina the Younger, Drusilla, and Julia Livilla would have taken turns sitting in the place of honor. Apparently, Caligula broke with this tradition and reserved the place of honor exclusively for Drusilla. This could also be explained by Caligula wanting to have her in a place of prominence in public after naming her his heir. 

Another reason for the rumors of incest that surrounded Drusilla and Caligula could be due to attempts to discredit Caligula's leadership after his death. The most popular source of these rumors comes from Suetonius, a Roman historian and writer who was not born until 28 years after Caligula's death. He wrote that "[Caligula] lived in habitual incest with all his sisters" and that the two had once been caught together by their grandmother, Antonia.

Death and aftermath

Drusilla died on 10 June 38 AD, probably of an illness that was rampant in Rome at the time. Caligula was said never to have left her side throughout her illness and, after she had died, he would not let anyone take away her body.

Caligula was badly affected by the loss. He buried his sister with the honours of an Augusta and acted as a grieving widower. He had the Roman Senate declare her a Goddess, as Diva Drusilla, deifying her as a representation of the Roman goddess Venus or the Greek goddess Aphrodite. Drusilla was consecrated as Panthea, most likely on the anniversary of the birthday of Augustus.

In addition the other honors she was given after her death by Caligula, he also declared a period of mourning. During this time, it became a capital crime to laugh, bathe, or dine with your parents, spouse, or children.

A year later, Caligula named his only known daughter, Julia Drusilla, after his dead sister. Meanwhile, the widowed husband of Drusilla, Marcus Aemilius Lepidus, reportedly became a lover to her sisters, Julia Livilla and Agrippina the Younger, in an apparent attempt to gain their support so that he could succeed Caligula. This political conspiracy was discovered during that autumn by Caligula while in Germania Superior. Lepidus was swiftly executed and Livilla and Agrippina were exiled to the Pontine Islands.

Cultural references
 In the Robert Graves novel, I, Claudius, the narrator of the story states that he believes that Drusilla was killed by Caligula, although he admits that he does not have firm evidence of this.
 This theme was embellished considerably in the 1976 BBC television adaptation of I, Claudius, where Drusilla was played by Beth Morris. A pregnant Drusilla was subjected to a brutal Caesarean section by an insane Caligula, who swallows the child off-camera as Chronos did his children. A subsequent shot depicting Caligula and his blood-soaked beard was cut from the episode before broadcast in the United States, but has since been restored in later VHS and DVD releases.
 Teresa Ann Savoy played Drusilla in the 1979 motion picture Caligula, which showed a version of Drusilla dying from a fever, followed by a scene of Caligula licking her corpse in mourning, and then having sexual intercourse with Drusilla one last time in an act of necrophilia.

Ancestry

See also 
 Julio-Claudian family tree

Notes

References

Further reading 
 Edmund Groag, Arthur Stein, Leiva Petersen (edd.), Prosopographia Imperii Romani saeculi I, II et III (Berlin, 1933), I 664

External links

1st-century Roman women
1st-century Romans
16 births
38 deaths
Burials at the Mausoleum of Augustus
Children of Germanicus
Deified Roman women
Incest
Julii Caesares
Julio-Claudian dynasty
People from Koblenz